Division No. 16 is a census division in Alberta, Canada. It is located in the northeast portion of northern Alberta and surrounds the Urban Service Area of Fort McMurray.

Census subdivisions 
The following census subdivisions (municipalities or municipal equivalents) are located within Alberta's Division No. 16.

Specialized municipalities
Regional Municipality of Wood Buffalo
Urban service areas
Fort McMurray
Improvement districts
Improvement District No. 24 (Wood Buffalo National Park)
Indian reserves
Allison Bay 219   
Charles Lake 225  
Chipewyan 201
Chipewyan 201A
Chipewyan 201B
Chipewyan 201C
Chipewyan 201D
Chipewyan 201E
Chipewyan 201F
Chipewyan 201G
Clearwater 175  
Collin Lake 223 
Cornwall Lake 224 
Devil's Gate 220  
Dog Head 218  
Fort McKay 174  
Gregoire Lake 176
Gregoire Lake 176A 
Janvier 194  
Namur Lake 174B
Namur River 174A
Old Fort 217  
Sandy Point 221  
Thabacha Náre 196A
Thebathi 196
Indian settlements
Fort Mackay

Demographics 

See also 
List of census divisions of Alberta
List of communities in Alberta

References 

Census divisions of Alberta